Second Creek may refer to:

Second Creek (Uwharrie River tributary), a stream in Randolph County, North Carolina
Secondcreek, West Virginia, an unincorporated community
Second Creek (Greenbrier River), a stream in West Virginia
Second Creek (Pocatalico River), a stream in Kanawha County, West Virginia
 Second Creek in the Adelaide eastern suburbs, a tributary of the River Torrens in South Australia